Jorge Guerrero López (born October 6, 1964) is a Mexican football manager and former player.

References

External links

1964 births
Living people
Association football midfielders
Atlético Morelia players
Mexican football managers
Footballers from Michoacán
Mexican footballers